Lisbon earthquake may refer to:

 
 
 1531 Lisbon earthquake
 1755 Lisbon earthquake, also known as the Great Lisbon earthquake
 1761 Lisbon earthquake

See also 
1909 Benavente earthquake

Earthquakes in Portugal
Earthquake